The bunt of a sail is the middle part of it, which is purposely formed into a kind of curved bag, or cavity, so that the sail might receive more wind. It is chiefly used in topsails, for courses are for the most part cut square, or at least with a small allowance, for bunt or compass.

Sailors would say, "the bunt holds much leeward wind", meaning that the bunt hangs too much to leeward.

The buntlines are small lines fastened to the bottom of the sails, in the middle part of the bolt rope, to the cringle; and so are passed through a small block, seized to the yard. Their use is to trice up the bunt of the sail, to better furl it up.

Sailboat components
Sailing rigs and rigging